Walnut pie is a pie prepared with walnuts as a primary ingredient. Whole or chopped walnuts may be used, or both, and toasted walnuts may be used. It may be prepared as a cream pie, and may include maple syrup, molasses, and cinnamon as ingredients. It may be prepared with a sweet filling base prepared with corn syrup, sugar, and eggs, similar to pecan pie filling. Chocolate and honey may also be used. Walnut pie may be prepared using fruits such as raisins, figs, plums, and cranberries, among others. Walnut pie may be served at room temperature or warmed. It may be topped with whipped cream or served à la Mode.

See also

Bündner Nusstorte, a walnut pie made in Switzerland
List of pies, tarts, and flans
Cashew pie
Chestnut pie
Date and walnut loaf
Peanut pie
Walnut and coffee cake
Walnut soup

References

Bibliography

American pies
Walnut dishes
Sweet pies